Mark Paul Freer (born July 14, 1968) is a Canadian former professional ice hockey player. He played 122 NHL games with the Philadelphia Flyers, Ottawa Senators, and Calgary Flames.

As a youth, he played in the 1981 Quebec International Pee-Wee Hockey Tournament with a minor ice hockey team from Peterborough, Ontario.

Career statistics

Regular season and playoffs

References

External links

1968 births
Living people
Calgary Flames players
Canadian ice hockey centres
Hershey Bears players
Houston Aeros (1994–2013) players
Ottawa Senators players
Peterborough Petes (ice hockey) players
Philadelphia Flyers players
Philadelphia Phantoms players
Saint John Flames players
Ice hockey people from Toronto
Undrafted National Hockey League players